Video Checkers is a 1980 video game developed and published by Atari, Inc. for the Atari VCS (later renamed to the Atari 2600).

Gameplay

The game is based on the traditional game of draughts (called "Checkers" in North America). There are 19 different variations of play.

Development
The game was developed by Carol Shaw when she worked at Atari. Shaw was one of the earliest female programmers, and as such, Video Checkers (together with 3D Tic-Tac-Toe) was one of the first commercially-released games written by a woman. She decided to work on the game because Bob Whitehead was working on Video Chess at the time. Working with 4 kilobytes of ROM and 128 bytes of RAM, her algorithm used alpha–beta pruning – more sophisticated than the algorithm developed at the same time by Activision co-founder Alan Miller for his game Checkers, which used 2 kilobytes of ROM. Miller would later call Shaw to offer her a job at Activision, impressed with her work on Video Checkers.

The artwork for the game was done by Steve Hendricks. Release of the game was announced at CES in June 1980.

Reception
Writing in The Player's Strategy Guide to Atari VCS Home Video Games in 1982, Electronic Games editors Arnie Katz and Bill Kunkel called the game "moderately challenging", remarking that the AI, "is usually capable of matching the skill level of just about any player." In a June 1983 review of Video Checkers, the game was described as "rather limited in its interest" "unless you are an addict of the game". In the 1984 German book, Das grosse Handbuch der Video Spiele, Harmut Huff gave the game a middling score.

In the 2011 book Classic Home Video Games, 1972-1984 A Complete Reference Guide, Brett Weiss praised the AI, saying it did "a reasonably good job", but criticised the way the screen went blank whilst the AI was planning its turn. In 2018 book The A-Z of Atari 2600 Games: Volume 2, Kieren Hawken gave the game a negative review, criticising the "sluggish" controls, the slow speed at which the AI takes its turns, and the basic graphics, giving the game a score of 3/10 overall.

Legacy 
Video Checkers was re-released in 2003 for Microsoft Windows in the collection Atari: 80 Classic Games in One! and in 2017 on the Atari Flashback series of consoles.

See also 

 List of Atari 2600 games
 Othello (1980 video game)

References

External links 
 Game manual at the Internet Archive

1980 video games
Atari 2600 games
Atari 2600-only games
Draughts
Turn-based strategy video games
Video games based on board games
Video games developed in the United States